Harriet Augusta Dorotea Löwenhjelm (18 February 1887 – 24 May 1918) was a Swedish artist and poet. She mainly considered herself an artist. She died at Romanäs sanatory in Tranås after some years of tuberculosis.

Family 
Löwenhjelm was the daughter of colonel Gustaf Adolf Löwenhjelm (1842–1929) and Margareta, née Dickson (born 1853). She had five siblings. Her older brother, Carl Löwenhjelm, was a medical doctor, and the younger one, Chrispin Löwenhjelm (1892–1983), was an officer and chamberlain. Her cousin Marianne Mörner was a docent in French at Lund University. She accompanied Löwenhjelm on a trip to Paris and in different ways inspired her in her poetic works. Mörner also introduced Löwenhjelm's poems and pictures into the literary Sweden of the 1920s.

Education 
Löwenhjelm studied at Anna Sandström's higher teacher seminary, Kerstin Cardon's drawing school, Konstakademien (1909–1911) and for the previous superintendent of Valands konstskola, professor Carl Wilhelmson.

Literary production 
Some of Löwenhjelm's most well-known poems are Jakt på fågel ("Bird hunt"), Tag mig. Håll mig. Smek mig sakta. ("Take me. Hold me. Caress me gently.") and Beatrice-Aurore, which has been set to music by Hjalmar Casserman. Her poems originally were a complement to her drawings. Her later poetry were filled of awareness of death and has a deepened religious dimension. Löwenhjelms poems were published posthumously in 1919.

Bibliography 
Dikter med dem tillhörande teckningar (1919)
Brev och dikter (1952)
Harriet Löwenhjelms bönbok (Manuscripts posthumously published in 1963)

W Polsce wydano: Harriet Löwenhjelm: Wiersze. Wybrał, ze szwedzkiego przełożył i opracował Ryszard Mierzejewski. Pieszyce 2015 https://www.granice.pl/ksiazka/wiersze/2929358

Literature 
Elsa Björkman-Goldschmidt: Harriet Löwenhjelm (1947)
Elsa Björkman-Goldschmidt (ed.): Brev och dikter, Harriet Löwenhjelm med teckningar av författarinnan (1952)
Lars Elleström: Från Lenngren till Lugn. En ironisk historia  (2005)
Boel Hackman: Att skjuta en dront,  (2011)

Further reading

External links 
Harriet Löwenhjelm at the Swedish Wikisource
Harriet Löwenhjelm-sällskapet - Literary Society
About Harriet Löwenhjelm at the Dickson family website

1887 births
1918 deaths
20th-century_deaths_from_tuberculosis
People from Helsingborg
Swedish artists
Swedish women writers
Writers from Scania
Swedish-language writers
Tuberculosis deaths in Sweden